Brown noise can refer to:

 Brownian noise, signal noise with a 1/f2 power spectrum
 Brown note, a tone at a certain frequency said to cause loss of bowel control
 World Wide Recorder Concert, also known as The Brown Noise, an episode of South Park